The Smith Park Architectural District was listed on the National Register of Historic Places in 1976.  It covers an "irregular pattern along N. West and N. Congress Sts. between Capitol St. and State Capitol", in Jackson, Mississippi.  The district was increased by a boundary increase on
October 29, 1993 which added 225 E. Capitol St., a building built in 1928 that was designed by architect C.H. Lindsley.  It was again increased in 2014, including the entire 200 block of East Capitol Street.  The centerpieces of the district are Smith Park, the only public square designated when Jackson was platted out in 1822, and the Mississippi Governor's Mansion, which stands facing the park.

References

See also
National Register of Historic Places listings in Hinds County, Mississippi

Geography of Hinds County, Mississippi
Jackson, Mississippi
Historic districts on the National Register of Historic Places in Mississippi
National Register of Historic Places in Jackson, Mississippi